A cantref (plural cantrefi or cantrefs; also rendered as cantred) was a medieval Welsh land division, particularly important in the administration of Welsh law.

Description
Land in medieval Wales was divided into cantrefi, which were themselves divided into smaller cymydau (commotes). The word cantref is derived from cant ("a hundred") and tref ("town" in modern Welsh, but formerly used for much smaller settlements). The cantref is thought to be the original unit, with the commotes being a later division. Cantrefi could vary considerably in size: most were divided into two or three commotes, but the largest, the Cantref Mawr (or "Great Cantref") in Ystrad Tywi (now in Carmarthenshire) was divided into seven commotes.

History

The antiquity of the cantrefi is demonstrated by the fact that they often mark the boundary between dialects. Some were originally kingdoms in their own right; others may have been artificial units created later.

Cantrefi were of particular importance in the administration of the Welsh law. Each cantref had its own court, which was an assembly of the uchelwyr, the main landowners of the cantref. This would be presided over by the king if he happened to be present, or if he was not present, by his representative. Apart from the judges there would be a clerk, an usher and sometimes two professional pleaders. The cantref court dealt with crimes, the determination of boundaries, and inheritance. The commote court later took over many of the functions of the cantref court, and in some areas the names of the commotes are much better known than the name of the cantref of which they formed parts.

The Cantrefi of Wales

Other Cantrefi
Cantref Coch is associated with the Forest of Dean, Gloucestershire, and defined as the land between the River Severn and the River Wye. It was traditionally part of the kingdom of Ergyng but would in later times, be recorded as part of the kingdoms of Gwent and Morgannwg. The Cantref was annexed into the Kingdom of England in 926 by king Æthelstan.

Cantre'r Gwaelod is an ancient sunken kingdom said to have occupied a tract of fertile land lying in Cardigan Bay. First mentioned in the Black Book of Carmarthen, the cantref is a recurring topic in Welsh literature and Welsh mythology. In one version of the story, Seithenyn a prince of the kingdom, is a notorious drunk and it was through his negligence that the sea swept through the open floodgates, flooding the land forever.

See also
Cantref Coch
Cantre'r Gwaelod
Hundred (county division)

Citations

References

Further study

 Cantref